The A. J. Dittenhofer Warehouse is a five-story cast-iron building at 427-429 Broadway in SoHo, Manhattan, New York City. Designed by Thomas R. Jackson in 1870, the building was converted to residential lofts in 2000 by the architect Joseph Pell Lombardi.

References 

1870 establishments in New York (state)
Broadway (Manhattan)
Cast-iron architecture in New York City
Commercial buildings completed in 1870
Commercial buildings in Manhattan
Residential buildings in Manhattan
SoHo, Manhattan
Warehouses in the United States